Yanks Ahoy is a 1943 American comedy film directed by Kurt Neumann and written by Earle Snell and Clarence Marks. The film stars William Tracy, Joe Sawyer, Marjorie Woodworth, Minor Watson and Frank Faylen. The film was released on June 29, 1943, by United Artists.

Plot
Sgt. Dorian 'Dodo' Doubleday (William Tracy) and Sgt. Ames (Joe Sawyer) attempt to attract the affections of Phyllis Arden (Marjorie Woodworth) while the ship they're on tracks a Japanese submarine in this comedy romp.

Cast  
 William Tracy as Sgt. Dorian 'Dodo' Doubleday
 Joe Sawyer as Sgt. Ames
 Marjorie Woodworth as Phyllis Arden
 Minor Watson as Capt. Scott
 Frank Faylen as Quartermaster Jenkins
 Walter Woolf King as Capt. Gillis
 Romaine Callender as Col. Elliott
 Robert Kent as Lt. Reeves

References

External links 
 

1943 films
American black-and-white films
Films directed by Kurt Neumann
United Artists films
1943 comedy films
American comedy films
Military humor in film
World War II films made in wartime
Films scored by Edward Ward (composer)
1940s English-language films
English-language comedy films